Ambrizal Umanailo (born 12 June 1996) is an Indonesian professional footballer who plays as a winger for Liga 1 club Borneo Samarinda.

Club career

Villa 2000
In 2012, Umanailo moved to Jakarta to join Villa 2000. He strengthened Villa 2000 in U-16 and U-18 and participate in the Pertamina League. He also played with Villa 2000 B in the Liga Nusantara, in addition to playing in Villa 2000 FC in the First Division League (Divisi Utama).

Persija Jakarta
In 2015, he moved to Persija Jakarta, but unfortunately the competition stalled because of an unrest between PSSI and Menpora. In the 2016 season, Umanailo appear extraordinary in Indonesia Soccer Championship between Persija Jakarta against Persipura Jayapura. Umanailo derived as a core player, several times he threatened the Persipura defense. He also scored first for Persija when they faced Persela Lamongan. Umanailo continued feedback from Ismed Sofyan, so, can produce a goal for Persija Jakarta.

Borneo FC
In 2018 Umanailo signed with Borneo for the 2018 Liga 1. He made his league debut on 25 March 2018 in a match against Sriwijaya. On 1 June 2018, Umanailo scored his first goal for Borneo against PSMS Medan in the 34th minute at the Segiri Stadium, Samarinda. He made 61 league appearances and scored 4 goals for Borneo FC.

Barito Putera
He was signed for Barito Putera to play in Liga 1 in the 2020 season. Umanailo made his debut on 29 February 2020 in a match against Madura United. On 15 March 2020, Umanailo scored his first goal for Barito Putera in the 35th minute against PSM Makassar. This season was suspended on 27 March 2020 due to the COVID-19 pandemic. The season was abandoned and was declared void on 20 January 2021.

References

External links
Ambrizal Umanailo at Soccerway

1996 births
Living people
Indonesian footballers
People from Ambon, Maluku
Sportspeople from Maluku (province)
Persija Jakarta players
Borneo F.C. players
PS Barito Putera players
Liga 1 (Indonesia) players
Association football midfielders
Association football forwards